Zervas is a Greek surname. Notable people with the surname include:

Annella Zervas (1900–1926), American nun
Arizona Zervas (born 1995), American rapper, singer, and composer
Konstantinos Zervas, Greek politician and mayor of Thessaloniki
Leonidas Zervas (1902–1980), Greek organic chemist 
Napoleon Zervas (1891–1957), Greek general and resistance leader
Nikolaos Zervas (1800–1869), Greek general

Greek-language surnames